Xenosoma nicander is a moth in the subfamily Arctiinae first described by Herbert Druce in 1886. It is found in Costa Rica and Panama.

References

Arctiinae